Ultimate Kronos Group (UKG) is an American multinational technology company with dual headquarters in Lowell, Massachusetts, and Weston, Florida. It provides workforce management and human resource management services.
 
The company was founded in April 2020 as a result of the merger of Ultimate Software and Kronos Incorporated. Former Kronos CEO Aron Ain was the CEO and chairperson of the combined company until July 1, 2022, when he stepped down as CEO to become Executive Chairperson.

History
 
On February 20, 2020, Ultimate Software and Kronos Incorporated announced they agreed to form a new cloud computing venture specializing in workforce management and human capital management. The combined company, valued at $22 billion, would be one of the largest cloud computing companies. Kronos CEO Aron Ain became CEO and chairman of the new company, with more than 12,000 employees and dual headquarters in Lowell, Massachusetts, and Weston, Florida. The merger was officially completed on April 1, 2020, and in August, the company's name was announced as Ultimate Kronos Group (UKG), which became effective on October 1. When discussing the name, Ain said it was chosen as a "reflection to honor our past as we also thought about what we wanted to be in the future [...] We didn't want to lose who we were and what we've achieved." Ain also said the company planned to primarily call itself UKG.
 
Fortune reports that due to the impact of COVID-19, the majority of UKG's workers switched to remote work from home.

In May 2021, the company appointed tech industry veteran Brian Reaves as the company's Chief Belonging, Diversity, and Equity Officer. 
 
UKG has been noted for its inclusive, diversified workforce and community-oriented work environment.

In December 2021, UKG launched its Close the Gap Initiative, a $3 million campaign funded by the company to address salary inequity for U.S. workers' wages, in particular for women and people of color.

In June 2022, UKG announced the promotion of Christopher Todd from President to chief executive officer, with Aron Ain becoming Executive Chairperson effective July 1, 2022.

Mergers and acquisitions
Following the merger of Ultimate Software and Kronos Incorporated, the Ultimate Kronos Group was established in April 2020. According to Society for Human Resource Management, the new company became one of the largest HR technology vendors in the highly competitive economy section that include ADP, Ceridian, Microsoft, Oracle Taleo, SAP Successfactors, and Workday.
 
In June 2021, the company acquired EverythingBenefits, a developer of cloud-based business software that connects employers to the insurance, retirement and other information. The acquisition allowed UKG to incorporate EverythingBenefits’ procedural knowledge including its suite of payroll, HR service delivery, and workforce management, among other tools.
 
On September 1, 2021,  UKG bought Great Place to Work, the company behind Fortune’s annual list of 100 Best Companies to Work For.

In November 2022, it was announced UKG had acquired the Oxford-headquartered strategic workforce planning software company, Quorbit.

Workforce Institute
Established in 2007, Workforce Institute is the company's think tank and research platform for organizations providing information on the Human Capital Management issues that includes working environment optimization, analytical and educational tools, accommodation of people with disabilities and more. The organization also conducts surveys and issues annual reports on global workforce trends and developments.

Ransomware attack 
In December 2021, UKG disclosed that it was targeted by a ransomware attack that was first detected on December 11, 2021. The malware attack affected the Kronos Private Cloud feature used by many large businesses including Boots, Gap Inc., Marriott International, MGM Resorts International, PepsiCo, Sainsbury's, Samsung, Staples Inc., Tesla, Inc., Whole Foods Market, Yamaha Corporation, YMCA, and others while some governmental entities such as the cities of Cleveland, Springfield, Massachusetts as well as the New York Metropolitan Transportation Authority were also affected.
 
A number of sources reported that the attack possibly occurred as a result of the Log4Shell zero-day,  but UKG claimed it did not have evidence of Log4Shell being responsible for the ransomware incident.

Ownership
Private equity firm Hellman & Friedman, who was the controlling shareholder of both Ultimate and Kronos, is the controlling shareholder of UKG. The Blackstone Group, which also owned stakes in both previous companies, is the largest minority investor with a 20–25 percent stake. Other minority investors include GIC, Canada Pension Plan Investment Board, and JMI Equity.

Products and services
 UKG Pro
 UKG Dimensions
 UKG Ready
 UKG HR Service Delivery (Formerly PeopleDoc)
 UKG Virtual Roster

References

External links
 
Workforce Institute
 

2020 establishments in Florida
2020 establishments in Massachusetts
American companies established in 2020
Cloud computing providers
Companies based in Broward County, Florida
Weston, Florida
Companies based in Lowell, Massachusetts
Human resource management software
Multinational companies headquartered in the United States
Private equity portfolio companies
Privately held companies based in Florida
Privately held companies based in Massachusetts
Software companies based in Florida
Software companies based in Massachusetts
Software companies established in 2020
Software companies of the United States